Don Greenwood is a board game designer and was a pioneer editor among commercial board-wargaming magazines. He began his own fanzine, Panzerfaust Magazine, which he oversaw from 1967 until 1972. He then joined The Avalon Hill Game Company in 1972, and took over editorship of that company's "house organ", The General Magazine, which office he held until 1982. He left Avalon Hill and continued to work in the wargame industry, notably for GMT Games.  He is the founder of the Origins, Avaloncon, and WBC gaming conventions and remains the WBC convention manager. Greenwood was also president of the Boardgame Players Association.  He was inducted into the Origins Award hall of fame in 1991 and the Charles Roberts Awards Hall of Fame in 1994. He was honored as a "famous game designer" by being featured as the king of spades in Flying Buffalo's 2011 Famous Game Designers Playing Card Deck.

Games
Greenwood was a prolific game designer, with a unique rules-writing style. Among the titles for which he was responsible:
Advanced Squad Leader (1985)
Age of Renaissance (1996)
Alexander the Great (1971)
Atlantic Storm (1997)
Baseball Strategy (1963)
Basketball Strategy (1974)
Beyond Valor (1985)
Breakout: Normandy (1992)
Caesar at Alesia (1975)
Circus Maximus (1979)
Crescendo of Doom (1979)
Galaxy: The Dark Ages (2000)
Gangsters (1992)
GI: Anvil of Victory (1982)
Gung Ho (1992)
Hedgerow Hell (1987)
New World (1990)
Paratrooper (1986)
Republic of Rome (1990)
Rise and Decline of the Third Reich (1974)
Road Kill (1993)
Streets of Fire (1985)
The Napoleonic Wars (2002)
Turning Point: Stalingrad (1989)
Yanks (1987)

References

External links
 
 BPA History

Year of birth missing (living people)
Living people
Board game designers